The University Athletic Association of the Philippines (UAAP) taekwondo tournament was held before in the second semester of the academic year. However when the UAAP Board transferred the volleyball tournament to the second semester in Season 69 (school year 2006-2007), Taekwondo was one of the second semester sports that was moved to the first semester.

History
The first UAAP Taekwondo Tournament was held during Season 50 (1987–88), with UST team sweeping the tournament with 6 - 0 win–loss card. National University did not field a team during the first tournament.

UAAP taekwondo and poomsae champions
Triple Championships:

Double Championships:

Demonstration sport:
 Fewer than four teams participating

Number of championships by school

References
 UST, La Salle defend crowns; Ateneo wins juniors title (Feb 13, 2002 - Season 64)

See also
 Taekwondo in the Philippines
 NCAA Taekwondo Championship

Taekwondo in the Philippines
Taekwondo
Taekwondo competitions